"Something Goin' On (In Your Soul)" is a song by American DJ, record producer and remixer Todd Terry featuring  American singers Martha Wash and Jocelyn Brown on vocals. It was released as the second single from Terry's debut album, Ready for a New Day (1997). The song peaked within the top 5 in both Italy and the UK, peaking at number four and five. It also reached number-one on the UK Dance Singles Chart and the US Billboard Hot Dance Club Play chart. The original song title was shortened to "Something Goin’ On" upon its release as a single, even though the full title was listed on the album.

As the follow-up to their successful version of "Keep on Jumpin'", which also reached number-one on the Hot Dance Club Play chart in 1996, it would become the second of two back to back number-ones on the chart for this collaboration between the three artists.

Critical reception
Fact magazine ranked "Something Goin' On (In Your Soul)" number 21 in their list of 21 Diva-House Belters That Still Sound Incredible in 2014. Joe Muggs wrote, "There is DEFINITELY something wrong with you if you don’t get why this is incredible." Music Week rated the song four out of five, stating that "the master is back with a surefire hit. Featuring exquisite guest vocals from Jocelyn Brown and Martha Wash, this catchy number will get any dancefloor busy and blare from radios in the coming weeks." 

Daisy & Havoc from RM gave it five out of five, picking it as Tune of the Week. They added, "Starting with old-style spoken praise for house music, this track is a spirit-raising, feel-good number that moves along at quite a pace, helped by an emotional but not overdone sung vocal." A reviewer from Sunday Mirror commented, "Todd and the boys Keep on jumpin' with a fat disco number the like of which hasn't been seen since the last one they did. Serious diva vocals come courtesy of Jocelyn Brown and Martha Wash. Fine." David Sinclair from The Times described it as an "infectious dancefloor stomp."

Track listings

 UK 12"
A1. "Something Goin' On" (Tee's Remix)
A2. "Something Goin' On" (Rhythm Masters Master Dub Mix)
B1. "Something Goin' On" (Loop Da Loop Uptown Mix)
B2. "Something Goin' On" (Loop Da Loop Downtown Mix)

 12" promo
A. "Something Goin' On" (TNT Dub Style) (7:12)  
B1. "Something Goin' On" (Stoney's Diva 2000) (6:32)   
B2. "Something Goin' On" (Pete's Holy Spirit Vocal Mix) (6:06) 

 12" commercial release
A1. "Something Goin' On" (Tee's Freeze Mix With Preacher) (8:12)   
A2. "Something Goin' On" (The DFA Mix) (6:38)  
A3. "Something Goin' On" (Preacher Vocal) (1:26)  
B1. "Something Goin' On" (Rhythm Masters Mix) (8:35) 
B2. "Something Goin' On" (Vission & Lorimer Sweepin Style) (5:59) 

 CD maxi
 "Something Goin' On" (Tee's Radio Edit) (3:35) 
 "Something Goin' On" (Tee's Freeze Edit With Preacher) (3:35) 
 "Something Goin' On" (The DFA Edit) (3:28)  
 "Something Goin' On" (Tee's Freeze Mix With Preacher) (8:12) 
 "Something Goin' On" (Rhythm Masters Mix) (8:35)   
 "Something Goin' On" (Vission & Lorimer Sweepin Stylee!) (5:59)

Charts

Weekly charts

Year-end charts

References

External links
Videoclip performance from YouTube

1997 singles
1997 songs
American house music songs
Jocelyn Brown songs
Martha Wash songs
Todd Terry songs
RCA Records singles